Rasak Bel Aaly is the fourth album by Jordanian singer Diana Karazon.

2010 albums
Diana Karazon albums
Arabic-language albums